Apiocamarops is a genus of fungi within the Boliniaceae family.

References

External links
Index Fungorum

Sordariomycetes genera
Boliniales